Public Internet exchange points in Ukraine are:
 UA-IX in Kyiv
 Digital Telecom Internet Exchange (DTEL-IX) in Kyiv
 Giganet in Kyiv, Odesa, Kharkiv, Moscow, Warsaw 
 Lviv Internet Exchange (LVIV-IX) in Lviv
 Donetsk Internet Exchange Point (EUNIC-IX) in Donetsk
 Kharkiv Internet Exchange (KH-IX) in Kharkiv
 Kherson Internet Exchange (KHS-IX) in Kherson
 Odessa Internet Exchange site (OD-IX) in Odesa
 Zaporizhia Internet Exchange (ZP-IX) in Zaporizhia

The most popular of these is the UA-IX with over 218 members and over 1000 Gbit/s steady throughput during peak hours on weekdays. However the most highloaded is Giganet with more than 380 members and over 2600 Gbit/s.

See also 
 Ukrainian Internet Exchange Network (UA-IX)
 List of Internet exchange points by size
 List of Internet exchange points

Notes

External links 
Official websites of public exchanges
  of the Ukrainian Internet Exchange Point
  of the Giganet Internet Exchange Point

 
Internet in Ukraine